Caelum Jordan is a professional rugby league footballer who plays as a  or er for the Dewsbury Rams in the Betfred Championship.

In 2021 he made his Super League début for Castleford against the Salford Red Devils.

References

External links
Castleford Tigers profile

2002 births
Living people
Castleford Tigers players
Dewsbury Rams players
English rugby league players
Rugby league centres
Rugby league players from Yorkshire
Rugby league wingers